The Richard Barrett House, at 36 Prospect Ave. in Park City, Utah, was built in the 1880s.  It was listed on the National Register of Historic Places in 1984.

It was deemed

References

		
National Register of Historic Places in Summit County, Utah
Houses completed in 1883